San Martín de las Pirámides is a municipality in the State of Mexico in Mexico. The municipality covers an area of 70 km².

As of 2005, the municipality had a total population of 21,511.

References

Municipalities of the State of Mexico
Populated places in the State of Mexico